This is a list of some of the ways regions is defined in the United States. Many regions are defined in law or regulations by the federal government; others by shared culture and history, and others by economic factors.

Interstate regions

Census Bureau-designated regions and divisions

Since 1950, the United States Census Bureau defines four statistical regions, with nine divisions. The Census Bureau region definition is "widely used ... for data collection and analysis", and is the most commonly used classification system.
 Region 1: Northeast
 Division 1: New England (Connecticut, Maine, Massachusetts, New Hampshire, Rhode Island, and Vermont)
 Division 2: Middle Atlantic (New Jersey, New York, and Pennsylvania)
 Region 2: Midwest (Before June 1984, the Midwest Region was designated as the North Central Region.)
 Division 3: East North Central (Illinois, Indiana, Michigan, Ohio, and Wisconsin)
 Division 4: West North Central (Iowa, Kansas, Minnesota, Missouri, Nebraska, North Dakota, and South Dakota)
 Region 3: South
 Division 5: South Atlantic (Delaware; Florida; Georgia; Maryland; North Carolina; South Carolina; Virginia; Washington, D.C. and West Virginia)
 Division 6: East South Central (Alabama, Kentucky, Mississippi, and Tennessee)
 Division 7: West South Central (Arkansas, Louisiana, Oklahoma, and Texas)
 Region 4: West
 Division 8: Mountain (Arizona, Colorado, Idaho, Montana, Nevada, New Mexico, Utah, and Wyoming)
 Division 9: Pacific (Alaska, California, Hawaii, Oregon, and Washington)

Puerto Rico and other US territories are not part of any census region or census division.

Federal Reserve Banks

The Federal Reserve Act of 1913 divided the country into twelve districts with a central Federal Reserve Bank in each district. These twelve Federal Reserve Banks together form a major part of the Federal Reserve System, the central banking system of the United States. Missouri is the only U.S. state to have two Federal Reserve locations within its borders, but several other states are also divided between more than one district.

 Boston
 New York
 Philadelphia
 Cleveland
 Richmond
 Atlanta
 Chicago
 St. Louis
 Minneapolis
 Kansas City
 Dallas
 San Francisco

Time zones

 UTC−12:00 (Baker Island, Howland Island)
 Samoa Time Zone (American Samoa, Jarvis Island, Kingman Reef, Midway Atoll, Palmyra Atoll)
 Hawaii–Aleutian Time Zone (Hawaii, Aleutian Islands (Alaska), Johnston Atoll)
 Alaska Time Zone (Alaska, excluding Aleutian Islands)
 Pacific Time Zone
 Arizona Time Zone (excluding the Navajo Nation)
Mountain Time Zone (excluding most parts of Arizona)
 Central Time Zone
 Eastern Time Zone
 Atlantic Time Zone (Puerto Rico, U.S. Virgin Islands)
 Chamorro Time Zone (Guam, Northern Mariana Islands)
 Wake Island Time Zone (Wake Island)

Courts of Appeals circuits

 First Circuit
 Second Circuit
 Third Circuit
 Fourth Circuit
 Fifth Circuit
 Sixth Circuit
 Seventh Circuit
 Eighth Circuit
 Ninth Circuit
 Tenth Circuit
 Eleventh Circuit
 D.C. Circuit

The Federal Circuit is not a regional circuit. Its jurisdiction is nationwide but based on the subject matter.

Bureau of Economic Analysis regions

The Bureau of Economic Analysis defines regions for comparison of economic data.

 New England: Connecticut, Maine, Massachusetts, New Hampshire, Rhode Island, and Vermont
 Mideast: Delaware, District of Columbia, Maryland, New Jersey, New York, and Pennsylvania
 Great Lakes: Illinois, Indiana, Michigan, Ohio, and Wisconsin
 Plains: Iowa, Kansas, Minnesota, Missouri, Nebraska, North Dakota, and South Dakota
 Southeast: Alabama, Arkansas, Florida, Georgia, Kentucky, Louisiana, Mississippi, North Carolina, South Carolina, Tennessee, Virginia, and West Virginia
 Southwest: Arizona, New Mexico, Oklahoma, and Texas
 Rocky Mountain: Colorado, Idaho, Montana, Utah, and Wyoming
 Far West: Alaska, California, Hawaii, Nevada, Oregon, and Washington

Unofficial regions

Multi-state regions

 American Frontier
 Appalachia
 Ark-La-Tex
 Black Dirt Region
 Border states:
 Civil War border states
 International border states
 Calumet Region
 The Carolinas
 Cascadia
 Central United States
 Coastal states
 Colorado Plateau
 Columbia Basin
 Contiguous United States
 The Dakotas
 Deep South
 Delmarva Peninsula
 Dixie
 Driftless Area
 East Coast
 Eastern United States
 Four Corners
 Great American Desert
 Great Appalachian Valley
 Great Basin
 Great Lakes Region
 Great Plains
 Gulf Coast
 High Plains
 Interior Plains
 Intermountain States
 Kentuckiana
 Llano Estacado
 Lower 48
 Michiana
 Mid-Atlantic states
 Mid-South states
 Midwestern United States
 Mississippi Delta
 Mojave Desert
 Mormon Corridor
 New England
 Northern New England
 Southern New England
 North Woods
 Northeastern United States
 Northern United States
 Northwestern United States
 Ohio Valley
 Ozarks
 Pacific Northwest
 Inland Northwest
 Pacific States
 Palouse
 Piedmont
 Piney Woods
 Rocky Mountains
 Southern Rocky Mountains
 Siouxland
 Southeastern United States
 Southern United States
 Southwestern United States
 Old Southwest
 Tidewater
 Tornado Alley
 Trans-Mississippi
 Twin Tiers
 Upland South
 Upper Midwest
 Virginias
 Waxhaws
 West Coast
 Western United States

Multi-territory regions
 Mariana Islands (Guam and the Northern Mariana Islands)
 Samoan Islands (American Samoa, except Swains Island) 
 Virgin Islands (the Spanish Virgin Islands and the U.S. Virgin Islands)

The Belts

 Bible Belt
 Black Belt
 Coal Belt
 Corn Belt
 Cotton Belt
 Fruit Belt
 Pine Belt
 Rice Belt
 Rust Belt
 Snowbelt
 Sun Belt

Interstate megalopolises

 Arizona Sun Corridor
 California
 Cascadia
 Great Lakes
 Gulf Coast
 Northeast 
 Piedmont Atlantic
 Southern Rocky Mountain Front

Interstate metropolitan areas

 Central Savannah River Area (part of Georgia and South Carolina)
 Baltimore–Washington metropolitan area (District of Columbia and parts of Maryland, Virginia, West Virginia, and Pennsylvania)
 Washington metropolitan area (District of Columbia and parts of Maryland, Virginia, and West Virginia)
 Greater Boston (parts of Massachusetts, Rhode Island, and New Hampshire)
 Charlotte metropolitan area (parts of North Carolina and South Carolina)
 Chattanooga Metropolitan Area
 Chicago metropolitan area (parts of Illinois, Indiana, and Wisconsin)
 Cincinnati metropolitan area (parts of Ohio, Indiana, and Kentucky)
 Columbus-Auburn-Opelika (GA-AL) Combined Statistical Area (parts of Georgia and Alabama)
 Delaware Valley (Philadelphia metropolitan area) (parts of Pennsylvania, New Jersey, Delaware, and Maryland)
 Evansville, IN–KY Metropolitan Statistical Area (parts of Indiana and Kentucky)
 Fargo–Moorhead (parts of North Dakota and Minnesota)
 Fort Smith metropolitan area (parts of Arkansas and Oklahoma)
 Front Range Urban Corridor (parts of Colorado and Wyoming)
 Greater Grand Forks (part of Minnesota and North Dakota)
 Hartford-Springfield (parts of Connecticut and Massachusetts)
 Kansas City metropolitan area (parts of Missouri and Kansas)
 Louisville metropolitan area (Kentuckiana) (parts of Kentucky and Indiana)
 Memphis metropolitan area (parts of Tennessee, Arkansas, and Mississippi)
 Michiana (parts of Michigan and Indiana)
 Minneapolis–Saint Paul (the Twin Cities) (parts of Minnesota and Wisconsin)
 New York metropolitan area (parts of New York, New Jersey, Connecticut, and Pennsylvania)
 Omaha–Council Bluffs metropolitan area (parts of Nebraska and Iowa)
 Portland metropolitan area (parts of Oregon and Washington)
 Quad Cities (parts of Iowa and Illinois)
 Sacramento metropolitan area (parts of California and Nevada)
 Greater St. Louis (parts of Missouri and Illinois)
 Texarkana metropolitan area (parts of Texas and Arkansas)
 Tri-Cities (parts of Tennessee and Virginia)
 Twin Ports (Duluth, Minnesota and Superior, Wisconsin)
 Hampton Roads region (parts of Virginia and North Carolina)
 Youngstown–Warren–Boardman metropolitan statistical area (parts of Ohio and Pennsylvania)

Intrastate and intraterritory regions

Alabama

 Alabama Gulf Coast
 Greater Birmingham
 Black Belt
 Central Alabama
 Lower Alabama
 Mobile Bay
 North Alabama
 Northeast Alabama
 Northwest Alabama
 South Alabama

Alaska

 Alaska Interior
 Alaska North Slope
 Alaska Panhandle
 Aleutian Islands
 Arctic Alaska
 The Bush
 Kenai Peninsula
 Matanuska-Susitna Valley
 Seward Peninsula
 Southcentral Alaska
 Southwest Alaska
 Tanana Valley
 Yukon-Kuskokwim Delta

American Samoa

 Manu'a Islands
 Ofu-Olosega
 Ta'ū
 Rose Atoll
 Swains Island 
 Tutuila and Aunu'u

Arizona

 Arizona Strip
 Grand Canyon
 North Central Arizona
 Northeast Arizona
 Northern Arizona
 Phoenix metropolitan area
 Southern Arizona

Arkansas
 Arkansas Delta
 Arkansas River Valley
 Arkansas Timberlands
 Central Arkansas
 Crowley's Ridge
 Northwest Arkansas
 South Arkansas

California

Colorado

 Central Colorado (part of Southern Rocky Mountains)
 Colorado Eastern Plains (part of High Plains)
 Colorado Mineral Belt (part of Southern Rocky Mountains)
 Colorado Piedmont (parts of the Front Range Urban Corridor and Colorado High Plains)
 Colorado Plateau (multi-state region)
 Colorado Western Slope (parts of Southern Rocky Mountains and Colorado Plateau)
 Denver Metropolitan Area (part of Front Range Urban Corridor)
 Four Corners Region (multi-state region of Colorado Plateau)
 Front Range Urban Corridor (multi-state region)
 High Plains (multi-state region of Great Plains)
 North Central Colorado Urban Area (part of Front Range Urban Corridor)
 Northwestern Colorado (part of Southern Rocky Mountains)
 San Luis Valley
 South-Central Colorado
 South Central Colorado Urban Area (part of Front Range Urban Corridor)
 Southern Rocky Mountains (multi-state region of Rocky Mountains)
 Southwestern Colorado (parts of Southern Rocky Mountains and Colorado Plateau)

Connecticut

Connecticut has no official regions. After abolishing county governments, all local governing is done by towns and cities, leaving counties as purely geographical and statistical entities. Some unofficial regions of Connecticut include:

 Central Naugatuck Valley
 Coastal Connecticut
 Connecticut panhandle
 Greater Bridgeport
 Greater New Haven
 Greater Hartford
 Housatonic Valley (shared with Massachusetts)
 Litchfield Hills
 Lower Connecticut River Valley
 Naugatuck River Valley
 New York Metropolitan Area/Gold Coast
 Southeastern Connecticut
 Western Connecticut

Delaware
"Upstate" or "Up North"
 Delaware Valley also known as "Above the Canal" (referring to the Chesapeake and Delaware Canal)
"Slower Lower"
 Cape Region
 Central Kent
 Delaware coast

District of Columbia

Florida

Directional regions

 Central Florida
 North Florida
 Northwest Florida
 North Central Florida
 Northeast Florida
 South Florida
 Southwest Florida
 West Florida
 East Florida

Local vernacular regions

 Big Bend
 Emerald Coast
 First Coast
 Florida Heartland
 Florida Keys
 Florida Panhandle
 Forgotten Coast
 Glades
 Gold Coast
 Halifax area (also Surf Coast and Fun Coast)
 Red Hills
 Nature Coast
 Space Coast
 Suncoast
 Tampa Bay Area
 Treasure Coast

Georgia
 Atlanta metropolitan area
 Central Georgia
 Central Savannah River Area
 Colonial Coast
 Golden Isles of Georgia
 North Georgia
 North Georgia mountains (Northeast Georgia)
 Southern Rivers
 Southeast Georgia
 Wiregrass Region

Physiographic regions
 Appalachian Plateau
 Blue Ridge Mountains
 Coastal Plain
 Piedmont
 Ridge-and-Valley Appalachians

Guam
 Cocos Island
 Guam (main island)
 Ritidian Point
 Tumon

Hawaii
 Hawaiʻi Island (Big Island)
 Hamakua Coast
 Kaʻū Desert
 Kohala Coast
 Kona Coast
 Mauna Kea
 Puna District
 Waiākea-Uka
 Kahoʻolawe
 Kauaʻi
 Nā Pali Coast
 Kaʻula
 Lānai
 Maui
 Haleakalā
 Molokini
 West Maui Mountains
 Iao Valley
 Molokaʻi
 Kalaupapa Peninsula
 Niʻihau
 Lehua
 Northwestern Hawaiian Islands
 Nihoa (Moku Manu)
 Necker Island (Mokumanamana)
 French Frigate Shoals (Kānemiloha)
 Gardner Pinnacles (Pūhāhonu)
 Maro Reef (Nalukākala)
 Laysan (Kauō)
 Lisianski (Papaāpoho)
 Pearl and Hermes (Holoikauaua)
 Kure Atoll (Mokupāpapa)
 Oʻahu
 Kaʻena Point
 Makapuʻu
 North Shore
 Waikīkī

Idaho

 Central Idaho
 Eastern Idaho
 Idaho Panhandle
 Magic Valley
 North Central Idaho
 Palouse Hills
 Southern Idaho
 Southwestern Idaho
 Treasure Valley

Illinois

 Central Illinois
 Champaign–Urbana metropolitan area
 Chicago metropolitan area
 Community areas in Chicago
 Fox Valley
 The Collar Counties
 North Shore
 Driftless Area
 Forgottonia
 Metro-East
 American Bottom
 River Bend
 Metro Lakeland
 Military Tract of 1812
 Northern Illinois
 Northwestern Illinois
 Peoria, Illinois metropolitan area
 Quad Cities
 Rock River Valley
 Shawnee Hills
 Southern Illinois (sometimes, Little Egypt)
 Tri-State Area
 Wabash Valley

Indiana

 East Central Indiana
 Indianapolis metropolitan area
 Michiana
 Northern Indiana
 Northwest Indiana
 Southern Indiana
 Southwestern Indiana
 Wabash Valley

Iowa

 Coteau des Prairies
 Des Moines metropolitan area
 Dissected Till Plains
 Driftless Area
 Great River Road
 Honey Lands
 Iowa Great Lakes
 Loess Hills
 Omaha–Council Bluffs metropolitan area
 Quad Cities
 Siouxland

Kansas
 East-Central Kansas
 Flint Hills
 High Plains
 Kansas City Metropolitan Area
 North Central Kansas
 Osage Plains
 Ozarks
 Red Hills
 Santa Fe Trail
 Smoky Hills
 Southeast Kansas

Kentucky
 The Bluegrass
 Cumberland Plateau or Eastern Coal Field
 Jackson Purchase
 Pennyroyal Plateau
 Western Coal Field

Louisiana

 Acadiana
 Cajun Heartland
 River Parishes
 Central Louisiana (Cen-La)
 Florida Parishes
 "French Louisiana" (Acadiana + Greater New Orleans)
 Greater New Orleans
 North Louisiana
 Southwest Louisiana

Maine
 Acadia
 Down East
 High Peaks / Maine Highlands
 Hundred-Mile Wilderness
 Kennebec Valley
 Maine Highlands
 Maine Lake Country
 Maine North Woods
 Mid Coast
 Penobscot Bay
 Southern Maine Coast
 Western Maine Mountains

Maryland

 Baltimore–Washington Metropolitan Area
 Capital region
 Chesapeake Bay
 Eastern Shore of Maryland
 Patapsco Valley
 Southern Maryland
 Western Maryland

Regions shared with other states:

 Allegheny Mountains
 Atlantic coastal plain
 Blue Ridge Mountains
 Cumberland Valley
 Delaware Valley
 Delmarva Peninsula consists of Maryland's and Virginia's Eastern Shore and all of Delaware
 Piedmont (United States)
 Ridge-and-Valley Appalachians

Massachusetts

 Western Massachusetts
 The Berkshires (shown in map)
 Housatonic Valley
 Pioneer Valley
 Quabbin-Swift River Valley
 Central Massachusetts
 MetroWest
 Montachusett-North County
 South County
 Blackstone River Valley
 Northeastern Massachusetts
 North Shore
 Merrimack Valley
 Cape Ann
 Greater Boston
 Southeastern Massachusetts
 Cape Cod and Islands
 Cape Cod
 Martha's Vineyard
 Nantucket
 South Coast
 South Shore

Michigan

Lower Peninsula 

 Northern Michigan
 Traverse Bay Area
 Straits Area
 Central/Mid-Michigan
 The Thumb
 Bluewater Area
 Tri-Cities
 Capital Region
 West Michigan
 Southwest Michigan
 Michiana
 Grand Rapids area
 Southeast Michigan
 Metro Detroit

Upper Peninsula 

 Western Upper Peninsula
 Copper Country
 Copper Island
 Central Upper Peninsula
 US 41 Corridor
 Eastern Upper Peninsula
 Straits Area
 Soo Area

Minnesota

 Arrowhead Region
 Boundary Waters
 Buffalo Ridge
 Central Minnesota
 Coulee Region
 Iron Range
 Minnesota River Valley
 North Shore
 Northwest Angle
 Pipestone Region
 Red River Valley
 Southeast Minnesota
 Twin Cities Metro

Mississippi
 Mississippi Alluvial Plain
 Mississippi Delta
 Mississippi Gulf Coast
 Natchez Trace

Missouri

 Boonslick
 Bootheel
 Dissected Till Plains
 Kansas City Metropolitan Area
 Lead Belt
 Little Dixie
 Ozarks
 Platte Purchase
 St. Louis Metropolitan Area

Montana
 Big Horn Mountains
 Eastern Montana
 The Flathead
 Glacier Country
 Glacier National Park
 Regional designations of Montana
 Two Medicine
 Western Montana
 Yellowstone National Park

Nebraska

 Nebraska Panhandle
 Pine Ridge
 Rainwater Basin
 Sand Hills
 Wildcat Hills

Nevada
 Black Rock Desert
 Lake Tahoe
 Las Vegas Valley
 Mojave Desert
 Pahranagat Valley
 Sierra Nevada

New Hampshire
 Connecticut River Valley
 Dartmouth-Lake Sunapee Region (overlaps with Connecticut River Valley)
 Great North Woods Region
 Lakes Region
 Merrimack Valley
 Golden Triangle
 Monadnock Region (overlaps with Connecticut River Valley)
 Seacoast Region
 White Mountains

New Jersey
 North Jersey
 Skylands
 Amwell Valley
 Black Dirt Region (shared with New York)
 Great Valley
 Hunterdon Plateau
 Ridge-and-Valley Appalachians
 Highlands
 Somerset Hills
 The Sourlands
 Gateway
 Chemical Coast/Soundshore
 Hudson Waterfront
 North Hudson
 Meadowlands
 Pascack Valley
 Raritan Bayshore
 West Hudson
 Central Jersey
 Bayshore
 Jersey Shore
 Shore Region
 South Jersey
 Shore Region
 New Jersey Pine Barrens
 Delaware Valley
 Southern Shore
 Cape May

New Mexico
 Central New Mexico
 Eastern New Mexico
 New Mexico Bootheel
 Northern New Mexico

New York

 Downstate New York
 New York metropolitan area (New York City)
 Long Island
East End
 The Hamptons
 North Shore (Gold Coast)
 South Shore
 Upstate New York
 Erie Canal Corridor
 Western New York
 Holland Purchase
 Burned-over district
 Finger Lakes
 former Leatherstocking Country (now the Central New York Region)
 Central New York
 Central New York Military Tract
 Phelps and Gorham Purchase
 Syracuse metropolitan area
 Mohawk Valley
 Southern Tier
 Capital District
 North Country
 Adirondack Mountains
 Adirondack Park
 Ski country
 Thousand Islands
 Tug Hill
 Catskill Mountains
 Borscht Belt
 Hudson Valley
 Shawangunk Ridge
 Black Dirt Region (shared with New Jersey)

North Carolina

 Western North Carolina
 Foothills Region
 South Mountains
 The Unifour (Catawba Valley Area)
 High Country (Boone Area)
 Land of the Sky
 Asheville Metropolitan Area
 Great Craggy Mountains
 Blue Ridge Mountains
 Black Mountains
 Brushy Mountains
 Great Balsam Mountains
 Unaka Mountains
 Unicoi Mountains
 Great Smoky Mountains
 Tennessee Valley
 Central North Carolina
 Piedmont Crescent
 Metropolitan Charlotte (Metrolina)
 Lake Norman Area
 Metropolitan Piedmont Triad
 Sauratown Mountains
 Uwharrie Mountains
 Yadkin Valley
 The Research Triangle
 New Hope Valley
 Eastern North Carolina
 Fayetteville Metropolitan Area
 Inner Banks
 Albemarle
 Global TransPark Economic Development Area
 Tidewater
 Lower Cape Fear (Wilmington Area)
 Outer Banks
 Crystal Coast
 Bogue Banks
 Down East
 Sandhills

North Dakota
 Badlands
 Drift Prairie
 Missouri Escarpment
 Missouri Plateau (Missouri Coteau in French)
 Red River Valley

Northern Mariana Islands

 Northern Islands
 Alamagan
 Anatahan
 Agrihan
 Asuncion Island
 Farallon de Medinilla
 Farallon de Pajaros
 Guguan
 Maug Islands
 Pagan
 Sarigan
 Rota
 Saipan
 Tinian

Ohio

 Allegheny Plateau
 Appalachian Ohio
 Cincinnati-Northern Kentucky metropolitan area
 Columbus, Ohio metropolitan area
 Connecticut Western Reserve (historic, now defunct)
 Great Black Swamp (shared with Indiana)
 The Lake Erie Islands
 Miami Valley
 Northeast Ohio (often used interchangeably with Greater Cleveland, but also includes the counties of Ashtabula, Portage, Summit, Trumbull, Mahoning and Columbiana.)
 Northwest Ohio

Oklahoma

 Central Oklahoma
 Cherokee Outlet
 Green Country
 Choctaw Country
 Little Dixie
 Northwestern Oklahoma
 Panhandle
 South Central Oklahoma
 Southwestern Oklahoma

Oregon

 Cascade Range
 Central Oregon
 Columbia Plateau
 Columbia River
 Columbia River Gorge
 Eastern Oregon
 Goose Lake Valley
 Harney Basin
 High Desert
 Hood River Valley
 Mount Hood Corridor
 Northwest Oregon
 Oregon Coast
 Palouse
 Portland metropolitan area
 Rogue Valley
 Southern Oregon
 Treasure Valley
 Tualatin Valley
 Warner Valley
 Western Oregon
 Willamette Valley

Pennsylvania

 Allegheny National Forest
 Coal Region
 Cumberland Valley
 Delaware Valley
 Dutch Country
 Endless Mountains
 Highlands Region
 Laurel Highlands
 Lehigh Valley
 Northern Tier
 Northeastern Pennsylvania
 Philadelphia Main Line
 Pittsburgh metropolitan area
 South Central Pennsylvania
 Susquehanna Valley
 The Poconos
 Western Pennsylvania
 Wyoming Valley

Puerto Rico

 Caja de Muertos
 Culebra
 Desecheo Island
 Isla de Mona
 Puerto Rico (main island)
 Cordillera Central
 El Yunque
 Vieques

Rhode Island
 Blackstone Valley
 Block Island
 East Bay
 West Bay
 South County

South Carolina
 The Lowcountry
 The Midlands
 The Upstate
 Travel/Tourism locations
 Grand Strand
 Lake Murray Country
 The Lowcountry & Resort Islands
 Old 96 District
 Olde English District
 Pee Dee
 Santee Cooper Country
 Other geographical distinctions
 Blue Ridge Mountains
 Charleston metropolitan area
 Columbia metropolitan area
 The Piedmont
 The Sandhills
 Sea Islands
 West Ashley

South Dakota

 East River and West River, divided by the Missouri River
 Badlands
 Black Hills
 Coteau des Prairies

Tennessee

 East Tennessee
 Middle Tennessee
 West Tennessee
 Other geographical distinctions:
 Highland Rim
 Nashville Basin
 Tennessee Valley

Texas

 Brazos Valley
 Central Texas
 Texas blackland prairies
 The Hill Country
 Gulf Coast
 Galveston Bay
 Greater Houston
 East Texas
 Piney Woods and Northeast Texas
 North Texas
 Dallas – Fort Worth Metroplex
 Texoma
 South Texas
 Rio Grande Valley
 Southeast Texas
 Golden Triangle
 Greater Houston
 Texas Midwest/West-Central Texas (includes Abilene, San Angelo, Brownwood, Texas)
 Texas Urban Triangle (Houston to San Antonio to Dallas-Fort Worth)
 West Texas
 Concho Valley
 Edwards Plateau
 Llano Estacado (a portion of northwest Texas)
 Permian Basin
 South Plains (includes 24 counties south of the Texas Panhandle and north of the Permian Basin)
 Texas Panhandle (pictured)
 Trans-Pecos
 Great Plains

U.S. Minor Outlying Islands

 Baker Island
 Howland Island
 Jarvis Island
 Johnston Island
 Kingman Reef
 Midway Atoll
 Navassa Island 
 Palmyra Atoll
 Wake Island

U.S. Virgin Islands
 Saint Croix
 Saint John
 Saint Thomas

Utah
 Cache Valley
 Colorado Plateau
 Dixie
 Great Salt Lake Desert
 Mojave Desert
 San Rafael Swell
 Uinta Mountains
 Wasatch Back
 Wasatch Front
 Wasatch Range

Vermont
 Burlington metropolitan area
 Champlain Valley
 Green Mountains
 Mount Mansfield
 Northeast Kingdom

Virginia

 Eastern Shore
 Hampton Roads
 Historic Triangle
 Piedmont region of Virginia
 Northern Neck
 Northern Virginia
 Greater Richmond Region
 Shenandoah Valley
 South Hampton Roads
 Southside Virginia
 Southwest Virginia
 Tidewater
 Tri-Cities
 Virginia Peninsula

Washington
 Central Washington
 Columbia Plateau
 Eastern Washington
 Kitsap Peninsula
 Long Beach Peninsula
 Okanagan Country
 Olympic Mountains
 Olympic Peninsula
 Puget Sound
 Rocky Mountains
 San Juan Islands
 Skagit Valley
 Southwest Washington
 Tri-Cities
 Walla Walla Valley
 Western Washington
 Yakima Valley

West Virginia
 Eastern Panhandle
 North Central West Virginia
 Northern Panhandle
 Potomac Highlands
 Southern West Virginia

Wisconsin

Wisconsin can be divided into five geographic regions.

 Central Plain
 Eastern Ridges and Lowlands
 Lake Superior Lowland
 Northern Highland
 Western Upland

Wyoming
 Bighorn Basin
 Powder River Country

See also
 Geography of the United States
 Historic regions of the United States
 List of metropolitan areas of the United States
 Media market, e.g., Nielsen Designated Market Area
 Political divisions of the United States
 United States territory
 Vernacular geography

Explanatory notes

References

External links
 U.S. Library of Congress Map of the US Regions

 
List
United States
United States geography-related lists
United States history-related lists
United States science-related lists